Blagovest (masculine form), Blagovesta (feminine form) (Благовест, Благовеста) is a name often found in Bulgaria. Its meaning is "person who brings kind news".

The name may refer to:
Blagovest Kisyov (born 1986), Bulgarian male badminton player
Blagovest Sendov (1932–2020), Bulgarian mathematician and politician
Blagovest Stoyanov (born 1968), Bulgarian Olympic medalist